Spilarctia rubriventris is a moth in the family Erebidae. It was described by George Talbot in 1926. It is found on Borneo.

References

Moths described in 1926
rubriventris